Jackie Pierre (born 27 May 1946) is a member of the Senate of France, representing the Vosges department.  He is a member of the Union for a Popular Movement.

See also
Politics of France

References
Page on the Senate website 

1946 births
Living people
Union for a Popular Movement politicians
French Senators of the Fifth Republic
Senators of Vosges (department)